The 2013–14 Wyoming Cowgirls basketball team represents University of Wyoming in the 2013–14 college basketball season. The Cowgirls, led by eleventh year head coach Joe Legerski. The Cowgirls played their home games at the Arena-Auditorium and are members of the Mountain West Conference.

Roster

Schedule

|-
!colspan=9| Exhibition

|-
!colspan=9| Regular Season

|-
!colspan=9| 2014 Mountain West Conference women's basketball tournament

See also
2013–14 Wyoming Cowboys basketball team

References 

Wyoming
Wyoming Cowgirls basketball seasons
Wyoming Cowgirls
Wyoming Cowgirls